Zygaenosia fuliginosa is a moth in the family Erebidae. It was described by Walter Rothschild in 1913. It is found in Papua New Guinea.

References

Nudariina
Moths described in 1913
Zygaenosia